Muskegon Heights is a city in Muskegon County in the U.S. state of Michigan. The population was 10,856 at the 2010 census.

Geography

The city is surrounded on the north by Muskegon and on the south by Norton Shores, with a small area of unincorporated Muskegon Township on the east side. Roosevelt Park is a very short distance to the west.

Demographics

2010 census
As of the census of 2010, there were 10,856 people, 3,996 households, and 2,682 families living in the city. The racial makeup of the city was 16.0% White, 78.3% African American, 0.3% Native American, 0.1% Asian, 1.4% from other races, and 3.8% from two or more races. Hispanic or Latino of any race were 4.2% of the population.

There were 3,996 households, of which 42.2% had children under the age of 18 living with them, 20.2% were married couples living together, 40.0% had a female householder with no husband present, 7.0% had a male householder with no wife present, and 32.9% were non-families. 28.4% of all households were made up of individuals, and 8.2% had someone living alone who was 65 years of age or older. The average household size was 2.66 and the average family size was 3.23.

The median age in the city was 30.3 years. 32.3% of residents were under the age of 18; 10.3% were between the ages of 18 and 24; 25.4% were from 25 to 44; 22.6% were from 45 to 64; and 9.6% were 65 years of age or older. The gender makeup of the city was 46.3% male and 53.7% female.

2000 census
As of the census of 2000, there were 12,049 people, 4,507 households, and 2,970 families living in the city. There were 5,108 housing units at an average density of 1,612.7/sq. mi. (622.1/km2). The racial makeup of the city was 17.69% White, 77.77% African American, 0.45% Native American, 0.25% Asian, 0.02% Pacific Islander, 1.63% from other races, and 2.19% from two or more races. Hispanic or Latino of any race were 3.52% of the population.

There were 4,507 households, out of which 36.9% had children under the age of 18 living with them, 25.0% were married couples living together, 35.2% had a female householder with no husband present, and 34.1% were non-families. 28.8% of all households were made up of individuals, and 9.7% had someone living alone who was 65 years of age or older.  The average household size was 2.66 and the average family size was 3.28.

In the city, the population was spread out, with 35.2% under the age of 18, 9.3% from 18 to 24, 27.0% from 25 to 44, 17.8% from 45 to 64, and 10.6% who were 65 years of age or older.  The median age was 29 years. For every 100 females, there were 82.6 males.  For every 100 females age 18 and over, there were 74.5 males.

The median income for a household in the city was $21,778, and the median income for a family was $26,144. Males had a median income of $30,027 versus $22,768 for females. The per capita income for the city was $12,456.  About 25.7% of families and 29.6% of the population were below the poverty line, including 41.8% of those under age 18 and 17.0% of those age 65 or over.

References

External links

City of Muskegon Heights

Cities in Muskegon County, Michigan